MEPC is a British-based property investment and development business. It is headquartered in Milton Park, Oxfordshire. It used to be listed on the London Stock Exchange and was once a constituent of the FTSE 100 Index. It is however now owned by the British Telecom Pension Fund and the Royal Mail Pension Fund.

History
The business was founded by Claude Moss Leigh in 1946 as the Metropolitan Estates & Property Corporation. Having started as a property investment business it diversified into the development of shopping malls in the 1970s. It adopted the shortened name of MEPC in 1973. In 1987 it acquired the Oldham Estate.

In 2000 the Company was acquired by Leconport Estates, a joint venture between the British Telecom Pension Fund and GE Capital. In 2003 GE Capital sold its investment to the British Telecom Pension Fund. Since then the Royal Mail Pension Fund acquired a substantial shareholding in MEPC.

In 2014, Hermes Real Estate exchanged on the sale of three MEPC parks in the South East, North West and Scotland: Chineham Park in Basingstoke, Birchwood Park in Warrington and Hillington Park in Glasgow.

Hermes Investment Management acquired MEPC in 2020.

Operations
The Group now focuses its activities on operating four business parks across the UK:

Milton Park - A business and science park located just outside Oxford near the town of Abingdon
Wellington Place - A business park located in the city centre of Leeds.
Silverstone Park - A business park with a focus on engineering and high-tech activities, located on the Silverstone Circuit in Towcester.

References

External links
Official Website
Silverstone Park

Companies based in Oxfordshire
Real estate companies established in 1946
Companies formerly listed on the London Stock Exchange
British companies established in 1946
Property companies of the United Kingdom
1946 establishments in England
2020 mergers and acquisitions